Rosemary "Rosie" Casals (born September 16, 1948) is an American former professional tennis player.

Casals earned her reputation as a rebel in the tennis world when she began competing in the early 1960s. During a tennis career that spanned more than two decades, she won more than 90 titles and was crucial to many of the changes in women's tennis during the 1960s and 1970s.

Early life
Casals was born in 1948 in San Francisco, to poor parents who had immigrated to the United States from El Salvador. Less than a year after Casals was born, her parents decided they could not care for her and her older sister, Victoria. Casals's great-uncle and great-aunt, Manuel and Maria Casals, took the young girls in and raised them as their own. When the children grew older, Manuel Casals took them to the public tennis courts of San Francisco and taught them how to play the game. He became the only coach Casals would ever have. But Nick Carter, former touring pro, father to Denise Carter-Triolo, who was once nationally ranked and made it to the fourth round at Wimbledon, gave her some lessons. He was the teacher of many ranking junior players, including Jeoff Brown, national junior doubles champ, and others at Arden Hills club, Sacramento, California, where Mark Spitz trained. Casals used a continental forehand like he did, with the power in it that all his students had, using the "racket back, step, and hit" method.

Casals attended San Francisco's George Washington High School.

While still just a teenager, Casals began to rebel on the court. She hated the tradition of younger players competing only against each other on the junior circuit. For an added challenge, she often entered tournaments to play against girls who were two or three years older.

Junior tennis was the first of several obstacles Casals faced during her tennis career. At five-feet-two-inches tall, she was one of the shortest players on the court. Another disadvantage for her was class distinction. Traditionally, tennis was a sport practiced in expensive country clubs by the white upper class. Casals's ethnic heritage and poor background immediately set her apart from most of the other players. "The other kids had nice tennis clothes, nice rackets, nice white shoes, and came in Cadillacs," Casals told a reporter for People. "I felt stigmatized because we were poor."

Unfamiliarity with country club manners also made Casals feel different from the other players. Traditionally, audiences applauded only politely during matches and players wore only white clothes on the court. Both of these practices seemed foolish to Casals. She believed in working hard to perfect her game and expected the crowd to show its appreciation for her extra efforts. In 1972 at the tradition-filled courts of Wimbledon, she was nearly excluded from competition for not wearing white. Later in her career, she became known for her brightly colored outfits, designed for her by Ted Tinling.

Tennis career
The frustrations Casals endured due to her size and background affected her playing style. Despite her sweet-sounding nicknames, "Rosie" and "Rosebud," she was known as a determined player who used any shot available to her to score a point — even one between her legs. "I wanted to be someone," Casals was quoted as saying in Alida M. Thacher's Raising a Racket: Rosie Casals. "I knew I was good, and winning tournaments — it's a kind of way of being accepted." By age 16 Casals was the top junior and women's level player in northern California. At 17 she was ranked eleventh in the country and was earning standing ovations for her aggressive playing style.

More experience on the national and international levels of play helped Casals improve her game. In 1966 she and Billie Jean King, her doubles partner, won the U.S. hard-court and indoor tournaments. That same year they reached the quarter-finals in the women's doubles at Wimbledon. In 1967 Casals and King took the doubles crown at Wimbledon  and at the United States and South African championships. The two dominated women's doubles play for years, becoming one of the most successful duos in tennis history. (They are the only doubles team to have won U.S. titles on grass, clay, indoor, and hard surfaces). Casals was also a successful individual player, ranking third among U.S. women during this period.

Casals soon became involved in another innovation: World Team Tennis (WTT). WTT involved tennis teams, each made up of two women and four men, from cities throughout the United States. Matches included both singles and doubles games. During her years with WTT, Casals played with the Detroit Loves in 1974, the Los Angeles Strings from 1975 through 1977, the Anaheim Oranges in 1978, and the Oakland Breakers in 1982, before serving as the player-coach of the San Diego Friars in 1983. She later played for the St. Louis Eagles in 1984, the Chicago Fyre in 1985, the Miami Beach Breakers in 1986, and the Fresno Sun-Nets in 1988.

Casals won 112 professional doubles tournaments, the second most in history behind Martina Navratilova.  Her last doubles championship was at the 1988 tournament in Oakland, California, where her partner was Navratilova.

Casals played in a total of 685 singles and doubles tournaments during her career.

Fights for rights of professional and women players
Despite her victories on the courts, Casals continued to fight tennis traditions on several fronts. Amateur tennis players (those who are unpaid) had always been favored over professionals (those who were paid). Because many amateur tennis players came from non-wealthy backgrounds, they were forced to accept under-the-table money in order to continue playing. This, in turn, made them professionals and prevented them from entering major tournaments that allowed only amateurs to play, such as Wimbledon. Fighting against this discrimination, Casals worked for an arrangement that allowed both amateur and professional tennis players to compete in the same tournaments.

Together with Billie Jean King, Casals challenged the large difference in prize monies awarded to male and female players. Even though they worked as hard and played as often as men, women earned much smaller prizes. In 1970 Casals and other women threatened to boycott the Pacific Southwest Championships if they were not paid higher prize money and not given more media attention. The ruling body of U.S. tennis, the United States Lawn Tennis Association (USLTA), refused to listen to their demands. In response, the women established their own tournament, the 1970 Virginia Slims Invitational. The attention generated by this successful tournament, which was won by Casals after a victory in the final over Judy Dalton, quickly brought about the formation of other women's tournaments and greater prize monies for women.

In 1979, the Supersisters trading card set was produced and distributed; one of the cards featured Casals's name and picture.

Post-tennis career and personal life
The strain of playing almost constantly took a physical toll on Casals. She underwent knee surgery in 1978 and was forced to change career directions. Since 1981 she has been president of Sportswomen, Inc., a California company she formed to promote a Women's Classic tour for older female players. She also began the Midnight Productions television company and has broadened her own sporting activities to include golf. In 1990, she again teamed with Billie Jean King, this time to win the U.S. Open Seniors' women's doubles championship. She was inducted into the International Tennis Hall of Fame in 1996.

Casals is married since 2014. Her wife is former WTA Tour trainer Connie Spooner.

Portrayal in film
Elizabeth Berridge played Casals in the 2001 TV movie When Billie Beat Bobby.
Natalie Morales plays Casals in the 2017 film Battle of the Sexes.

Grand Slam finals

Singles: 2 (2 runner-ups)

Women's doubles: 21 (9 titles, 12 runner-ups)

Mixed doubles: 6 (3 titles, 3 runner-ups)

Grand Slam singles tournament timeline

Note: The Australian Open was held twice in 1977, in January and December.

Casals was originally seeded 14th for the 1978 Wimbledon Championships, but a knee injury forced her withdrawal before the draw was made

See also
 Performance timelines for all female tennis players who reached at least one Grand Slam final

References

External links
 
 
 
 

1948 births
American female tennis players
American sportspeople of Salvadoran descent
International Tennis Hall of Fame inductees
Tennis commentators
Tennis players from San Francisco
United States National champions (tennis)
US Open (tennis) champions
Wimbledon champions 
Wimbledon champions (pre-Open Era)
Grand Slam (tennis) champions in women's doubles
Grand Slam (tennis) champions in mixed doubles
Living people
21st-century American women
Lesbian sportswomen
American LGBT sportspeople